There are many types of implant bars, including this Kugel B Bar. Implant bars are a mix between dentures and implants. Unlike common dentures, a bar is implanted in the patient's mouth, and the denture snaps onto the bar to hold it in place. These are generally made of acrylic with the higher-quality bars using natural-looking teeth and gums.

External links
 More examples of implant bars available at Georgia Dental Laboratory's website

Restorative dentistry
Bar restoration is